Paulie is a 1998 American adventure fantasy comedy film about a disobedient talking parrot named Paulie, starring Tony Shalhoub, Cheech Marin, Gena Rowlands, Hallie Eisenberg, and Jay Mohr. Mohr performs both the voice of the title character and the on-screen supporting role of Benny, a character who has a lot of dialogue with him. It received mixed to positive reviews and was a box office disappointment, grossing $26.9 million domestically against a $23 million budget. However, in the years after its release, Paulie would find a larger audience on home media sales.

Plot
While working as a janitor at an American institute, Russian immigrant and former teacher of literature Misha Vilyenkov encounters Paulie, a blue-crowned conure who humans can understand and is shocked to see him speaking as clearly as a human. Subsequently, he doesn't speak a word when Misha brings others to witness him.

Misha entices Paulie to tell him his story by offering him pieces of mango. He starts by telling about his original owner, a little girl named Marie who stutters. The story transitions to a flashback scene in which he is a baby. As Marie works on speech therapy, he begins to speak too, beginning with understanding the meaning of words and progressing to the construction of complex sentences. Marie's father, Warren, a soldier, returns home from Vietnam and decides that Paulie is not helping her. His resentment of the close bond between them, and their shared progress in speech development, is evident. It becomes obvious that Warren wants Marie to forget Paulie, when he brings her a cat, which Paulie does not get along with. Once again, Warren accuses him for Marie's speaking problems and believes she has imagined his ability to speak to humans. Eventually, after a dramatic event in which she falls off the roof in an attempt to teach Paulie to fly, Warren convinces her mother, Lila, to send him away, which devastates Marie.

Paulie is passed from one owner to another, eventually ending up in a pawn shop, owned by Artie where he spends his time insulting the customers. One day, a shady customer named Benny shows interest in purchasing him, thinking he could profit from his ability to talk to humans. Before he can act, however, a widowed artist named Ivy purchases him with the intent of reforming his rude personality. She befriends him and agrees to help him find Marie, who has moved to Los Angeles. They begin traveling using her mobile home, but when she loses her sight in the middle of their trip, Paulie decides to stay and take care of her. After she dies, Paulie, having finally learned to fly, continues his journey.

In East Los Angeles, Paulie joins a group of performing conures owned by migrant musician Ignacio, temporarily forgetting about Marie as he develops feelings for a female conure named Lupe. At one of his performances, Benny, having also moved to Los Angeles, recognizes him and attempts to purchase him from Ignacio. When Ignacio refuses his offer, Benny makes a phony police call at one of his performances. As the police show up, Benny kidnaps Paulie amidst all the chaos and Ignacio is arrested and presumably deported. Under Benny's influence, Paulie begins a life of crime. In a botched jewel theft, he flies down through the chimney of a house, where he is trapped inside, and then abandoned.

Paulie is then brought to the institute, his current home, where Dr. Reingold, the head of the institute, his employees and fellow scientists are stunned by his ability to speak to humans. They subject him to testing, and Reingold promises that he will be reunited with Marie when they are done. When he discovers that he has been lied to—that Marie has been found but the institute has instead decided to keep him as their property—he refuses to cooperate with any more tests, humiliating Reingold in front of his scientific peers by acting like an ordinary parrot and then insulting him. As a result, his wings are clipped, and he is eventually imprisoned in the basement when he starts pecking the researchers.

Moved by Paulie's story, Misha decides to give up his menial job to release him and take him to Marie. After escaping from the institute, freeing the encaged animals, and taking a bus to her address, they find her, now a full grown, beautiful young woman unrecognizable to Paulie. After a moment of confusion, Paulie and Marie are happily reunited as she sings his favorite song and he remembers her. The film ends with the trio happily entering her house.

Cast
 Jay Mohr as the voice of Paulie, a blue-crowned parakeet
 Mohr also plays Benny, a small-time thief
 Tony Shalhoub as Misha Belenkoff, a recent US immigrant from Russia
 Gena Rowlands as Ivy, a widowed artist
 Hallie Eisenberg as Marie Alweather, a young girl who stutters
 Trini Alvarado as Adult Marie
 Cheech Marin as Ignacio, a musician
 Bruce Davison as Dr. Reingold, a biological research scientist
 Buddy Hackett as Artie, owner of a pawn shop
 Matt Craven as Warren Alweather, Marie's father
 Bill Cobbs as Virgil, a janitor at the institute
 Tia Texada as Ruby and the voice of Lupe, a jandaya parakeet
 Laura Harrington as Lila Alweather, Marie's mother
 Jerry Winsett as Mr. Tauper

Production

Directed by John Roberts and written by Laurie Craig, the film's production budget was $23 million.

During the production of the film, 14 trained blue-crowned conures were used to portray the titular character, with other conure species such as nanday, jenday and cherry-headed conures appearing in supporting roles.

Reception

The film scored a 62% approval rating at Rotten Tomatoes from 37 reviews, with an average rating of 6.2/10. It was distributed in 24 countries and 10 different languages between 1998 and 1999. Box office receipts grossed $5,369,800 on the opening weekend, and $26,875,268 total. It was released in 1,812 North American theaters.

Awards and nominations

References

External links

 
 
 
 A bird's review of the movie

1998 films
1990s adventure films
1990s buddy comedy films
1990s children's comedy films
1990s fantasy comedy films
American adventure comedy films
American buddy comedy films
American children's adventure films
American children's comedy films
American children's fantasy films
American fantasy comedy films
Animal adventure films
DreamWorks Pictures films
Fictional parrots
Films scored by John Debney
Films about birds
Films set in 1978
Films set in 1998
Films set in Los Angeles
Films set in New Jersey
Mutual Film Company films
Talking animals in fiction
1998 comedy films
1990s English-language films
1990s American films